Ana Lemos may refer to:

 Ana Cláudia Lemos (born 1988), Brazilian track and field athlete
 Ana Margot Lemos (born 1986), Colombian weightlifter
 Ana Amélia Lemos (born 1945), Brazilian journalist and politician